César de Diego (18 June 1924 – July 2015) was a Spanish fencer. He competed in the individual and team sabre events at the 1960 Summer Olympics.

References

External links
 

1924 births
2015 deaths
Sportspeople from Oviedo
Spanish male sabre fencers
Olympic fencers of Spain
Fencers at the 1960 Summer Olympics